Telmatobius verrucosus is a species of frog in the family Telmatobiidae.
It is endemic to Bolivia.
Its natural habitats are subtropical or tropical moist montane forest and rivers.
It is threatened by habitat loss.

References

verrucosus
Amphibians of the Andes
Amphibians of Bolivia
Endemic fauna of Bolivia
Taxonomy articles created by Polbot
Amphibians described in 1899